The Institute of Chartered Accountants of the Eastern Caribbean (ICAEC) is a professional accountancy body formed on June 17, 2004 representing accountants in the Eastern Caribbean, including Grenada, St Kitts & Nevis, St Lucia and Antigua & Barbuda.

Members of the accountancy bodies which had previously been active in the region (the Institute of Chartered Accountants of Antigua and Barbuda, the St Kitts-Nevis Association of Chartered Accountants and the Institute of Chartered Accountants of St Lucia) became the founder members of the ICAEC which established 3 branches in St Kitts & Nevis, St Lucia and Antigua & Barbuda.

ICAEC is a member of the Institute of Chartered Accountants of the Caribbean.

References

Eastern Caribbean
3. Website for organization http://www.icaec.org/